Huỳnh Tấn Hùng (born 17 June 1992) is a Vietnamese footballer who plays as a midfielders for XSKT Cần Thơ. On 4 July 2015 Huỳnh scored in a 4-3 shock win over Đồng Nai in what was only Cần Thơ's second win of the 2015 season.

References

1992 births
Living people
Vietnamese footballers
Can Tho FC players
V.League 1 players
Association football midfielders